This article is about the history of Saturday Night Live from 2015 through 2020.

2015–2016 season 
The 2015–2016 season of Saturday Night Live began on October 3, 2015 with host and musical guest Miley Cyrus, and concluded on May 21, 2016 with host Fred Armisen and musical guest Courtney Barnett.

Bumper format 
Various old bumper formats return. Each host has several bumper shots on a solid color faded background, where their image may be repeated or given other various picture effects. Each host also has one or two photos of him or her in costume around NBC Studios. The musical guest for each episode has two bumper photos on solid colored backgrounds.

Cast 
The entire cast returned from last season. This season has a cast of 16 members, including five African American cast members (the most to ever be in the cast at once). As in previous seasons, the cast is separated into a most established repertory company, and a newer featured company. Jon Rudnitsky was the only new addition to the cast prior to the season premiere. Four cast members (Beck Bennett, Colin Jost, Kyle Mooney, and Sasheer Zamata) were upgraded from featured to repertory.

Repertory players
 Vanessa Bayer
 Beck Bennett
 Aidy Bryant
 Colin Jost
 Taran Killam
 Kate McKinnon
 Kyle Mooney
 Bobby Moynihan
 Jay Pharoah
 Cecily Strong
 Kenan Thompson
 Sasheer Zamata

Featured players
 Michael Che
 Pete Davidson
 Leslie Jones
 Jon Rudnitsky

 The third episode, hosted by Tracy Morgan, was the comedian's first large comedy appearance since suffering head injuries from a near fatal car crash.
 The announcement of Donald Trump returning to host on the fourth episode drew controversy for several reasons:
 Hispanic and Latino organizations called for Trump to be removed as host due to controversial comments he had made regarding immigration. An online petition was formed requesting his removal.
 Trump's hosting was filed with the Federal Communications Commission in regards to the equal-time rule. Although no candidate has ever requested an appearance on Saturday Night Live due to equal-time, concerns were raised over whether SNL qualified for an exception to the rule as a live entertainment program.
 Amy Poehler and Tina Fey co-hosted the season's December 19 episode, marking the first time an episode has featured multiple hosts since 2004 (the season 29 episode hosted by Nick Lachey and Jessica Simpson), as well as the first time two female cast members have hosted, and the first time since season 12's Christmas episode hosted by Steve Martin, Chevy Chase, and Martin Short that two former cast members have hosted.
 Tina Fey and Amy Poehler received a historic co-nomination for Outstanding Guest Actress in a comedy for their roles as co-host of the Christmas episode, which they ultimately won.

Problems with election coverage
As usual during election seasons, SNL has placed particular emphasis on the 2016 presidential election. Given the unusually large field of candidates, some impressions of candidates shift or have shifted based on who remains in the race.

On the Democratic side, Kate McKinnon is the show's current Hillary Clinton. McKinnon debuted as Clinton in Season 40, Episode 15 (though she previously portrayed an actress portraying Clinton). While they remained in the race, cast members Taran Killam and Kyle Mooney portrayed Martin O'Malley and Lincoln Chafee, respectively, both debuting in Season 41, Episode 3. Former candidate Jim Webb was portrayed by Alec Baldwin, also debuting in the aforementioned episode. Larry David has made recurring appearances to portray Bernie Sanders.

There was media speculation as to who would play whom for the upcoming election prior to the season. The casting was made problematic because many of the candidates were played by the same impressionists prior to the election. Marco Rubio, Ted Cruz, and Rand Paul had all been portrayed by Taran Killam. Chris Christie was portrayed by Bobby Moynihan, who had also played Cruz. Mike Huckabee and Jeb Bush were both portrayed by Beck Bennett. Additionally, Pete Davidson and Colin Jost were not considered by speculators to be generally desired for the job, since neither was an impressionist. Carly Fiorina had been portrayed by McKinnon on one occasion, while Ben Carson was portrayed by Kenan Thompson. No one on the current cast had portrayed John Kasich.

More issues further complicated the matter. Just prior to the start of the season, SNL announced that Killam would be portraying Donald Trump for the upcoming election, which meant that Killam would be portraying four of the candidates in the main Republican race. SNL ultimately was forced to wait until their ninth episode to tackle a Republican debate, when the field was sufficiently narrowed.

For the December 19 episode, the first to feature a debate, several impressions were ultimately moved permanently to new cast members. Jimmy Fallon was initially offered the role of Trump on a recurring cameo basis, but a last-minute change resulted in announcer Darrell Hammond portraying him as he had done for fourteen seasons in the cast. Killam ultimately portrayed Cruz, while Moynihan portrayed Christie. Rubio was played by Davidson, Bush by Bennett, and Paul by Kyle Mooney. Cecily Strong and Jay Pharoah portrayed Fiorina and Carson, respectively, while Colin Jost acted as a stand-in for Kasich, with no lines. Rudnitsky portrayed debate moderator Wolf Blitzer.

The following episode, on January 16, featured another debate, with a slightly smaller Republican field. Carly Fiorina had been demoted to the earlier undercard debate, and while Paul and Kasich remained on the mainstage, SNL chose not to include them in the sketch. Trump, Cruz, Christie, Rubio, Bush, and Carson were all portrayed by the same people that portrayed them in the earlier episode.

Despite Hammond's acclaimed impression, speculation remained as to whether he was playing the role because he was needed (as Killam was playing Cruz) or because his impression was superior. The show ultimately confirmed that Hammond was going to be portraying Trump indefinitely; the following week, he appeared alongside Tina Fey's Sarah Palin in a sketch without Killam, confirming that he would continue to play Trump even if Killam were available (for the time being). Killam, in turn, was confirmed as the show's indefinite Cruz, in a sketch where he portrayed him when Moynihan was not present.

2016–2017 season

Season 42 was indirectly confirmed via advertising plans from NBC's sales division. The announcement revealed that the program will contain 30% less advertisement time in the coming season. Additionally, select NBC advertising clients will be given the opportunity to have their brand appear in promotional sketches, called "pods". Six of these pods will air each season. 

The season premiered on October 1, 2016 with host Margot Robbie and musical guest The Weeknd, and concluded on May 20, 2017, with host Dwayne Johnson and musical guest Katy Perry.

Cast 
On June 24, 2016, Lorne Michaels announced that Michael Che and Colin Jost would continue as the anchors of "Weekend Update". Both were featured on SNL special editions of "Weekend Update" for the Democratic and Republican Conventions.

It was also announced that Michael Che, Pete Davidson, and Leslie Jones would all be upgraded from featured players to repertory status.

This was also the final season for cast members Bobby Moynihan, Vanessa Bayer and Sasheer Zamata.

The above-named changes kept the cast membership for this season at 16 members, with four African American cast members and one Hispanic cast member. As in previous seasons, the cast is listed in two separate groups: repertory and featured players.

Repertory players
 Vanessa Bayer
 Beck Bennett
 Aidy Bryant
 Michael Che
 Pete Davidson
 Leslie Jones
 Colin Jost
 Kate McKinnon
 Kyle Mooney
 Bobby Moynihan
 Cecily Strong
 Kenan Thompson
 Sasheer Zamata

Featured players
 Mikey Day
 Alex Moffat
 Melissa Villaseñor

Election coverage
On September 28, SNL announced that while Kate McKinnon would return as Hillary Clinton for its parodies of the 2016 presidential election, Alec Baldwin  would play the role of Donald Trump, replacing  Darrell Hammond, who continues as the show's announcer.

2017–2018 season

During the last episode of Weekend Update Summer Edition (on August 24, 2017), it was confirmed that SNL had been renewed for season 43, and would debut on September 30, 2017, with host Ryan Gosling, and musical guest Jay-Z, and concluded on May 19, 2018 with host Tina Fey and musical guest Nicki Minaj.

As was the case in the previous two seasons, this season had a cast of 16, with four African-Americans (Thompson, Jones [the only African-American female cast member of this season], Che, Redd) and one Hispanic (Villaseñor). As usual, the cast in listed in two separate groups: repertory and featured.

Due to his return for a 15th consecutive season, Kenan Thompson became the show's longest-running cast member, surpassing the previous record of 14 seasons set by Darrell Hammond.

Repertory players
Beck Bennett
Aidy Bryant
Michael Che
Pete Davidson
Leslie Jones
Colin Jost
Kate McKinnon
Kyle Mooney
Cecily Strong
Kenan Thompson

Featured players
Mikey Day
Heidi Gardner
Alex Moffat
Luke Null
Chris Redd
Melissa Villaseñor

Notes 
On September 26, it was announced that Heidi Gardner of The Groundlings, Luke Null of iO Chicago (the second cast member to have been born in the 1990s, though Pete Davidson is still the youngest cast member, as Null was born in 1990 while Davidson was born in 1993), and stand-up comedian Chris Redd from Second City would be added to the cast. Redd was originally announced as joining the cast the previous season, but did not end up doing so. On that same day, the return of the remaining cast members from Season 42 (repertory and featured) was confirmed as well. It was also announced that Sam Jay, Gary Richardson, Erik Marino, Andrew Dismukes, Steven Castillo, Claire Friedman and Nimesh Patel would all join the writing team.
On August 15, 2018, it was announced that Luke Null would not be returning for the show's 44th season.

2018–2019 season

Prior to the premiere of the 44th season of Saturday Night Live, Ego Nwodim was announced as a new featured player for the show.  The season premiered on September 29, 2018 with host Adam Driver and musical guest Kanye West, and concluded on May 18, 2019, with host Paul Rudd and musical guest DJ Khaled.

There are 16 cast members, with five African-Americans (Che, Jones, Nwodim, Redd, Thompson) and one Hispanic (Villaseñor). The cast is listed in two separate groups: repertory and featured.

Repertory players
Beck Bennett
Aidy Bryant
Michael Che
Pete Davidson
Mikey Day
Leslie Jones
Colin Jost
Kate McKinnon
Alex Moffat
Kyle Mooney
Cecily Strong
Kenan Thompson
Melissa Villaseñor

Featured players
Heidi Gardner
Ego Nwodim
Chris Redd

Notes
Despite mounting rumors that this would be the last season for Kenan Thompson, Thompson insisted he would not be leaving SNL anytime soon.
It was also reported that Kate McKinnon, whose contract is expiring, may have been eyeing her own SNL exit. However, it was announced that she would be returning for the 45th season, having renegotiated her contract.   
On August 27, 2019, it was also announced that Leslie Jones would not return to SNL for the next season, after having been a cast member since the 40th season.

2019–2020 season

The 45th season of Saturday Night Live premiered on September 28, 2019 with host Woody Harrelson and musical guest Billie Eilish, and concluded on May 9, 2020 with host Kristen Wiig and musical guest Boyz II Men.

On August 27, 2019, NBC announced that Leslie Jones would not be returning to SNL after five years, in favor of focusing on her movie career and other projects coming up. It was also announced that Kate McKinnon would be returning for her eighth full season on SNL.

On September 12, 2019, NBC also confirmed the hiring of three new featured players: Bowen Yang, previously a staff writer for the show who appeared on last season's episode hosted by Sandra Oh as Kim Jong-Un; Chloe Fineman, both a regular performing at the Groundlings and a New Face at the 2018 "Just for Laughs" Festival in Montreal; and Shane Gillis, a stand-up comedian who was recognized as a New Face at the 2019 "Just for Laughs" Festival. However, almost immediately, Gillis' hiring was met with backlash after video clips of him making racially and sexually offensive remarks (including anti-Asian slurs against 2020 election hopeful Andrew Yang) had surfaced, and he was subsequently fired just four days later, less than two weeks before the season began.

On September 24, 2019, it was confirmed that featured players Heidi Gardner and Chris Redd would be upgraded to repertory status this season.

This season has 17 cast members, with four African-Americans (Thompson, Che, Redd, Nwodim), one Latina-American (Villaseñor) and one Asian-American (Yang).

On March 16, 2020, the season was indefinitely halted due to the then-rising COVID-19 pandemic and subsequent lockdown of most non-essential businesses and public venues. The show returned on April 11th, 2020 under the name SNL Stays at Home (which lasted for three episodes) and featured low-budget short films and Zoom-based sketches done in or around the homes of the cast members. The first episode was hosted by Tom Hanks with musical guest Chris Martin, the second episode had no host (but did have a special appearance by Brad Pitt) with Miley Cyrus as musical guest, and the third episode was hosted by Kristen Wiig with musical guest Boyz II Men.

Repertory players
 Beck Bennett
 Aidy Bryant
 Michael Che
 Pete Davidson
 Mikey Day
 Heidi Gardner
 Colin Jost
 Kate McKinnon
 Alex Moffat
 Kyle Mooney
 Chris Redd
 Cecily Strong
 Kenan Thompson
 Melissa Villaseñor

Featured players
 Chloe Fineman
 Ego Nwodim
 Bowen Yang

Notes
Yang is also the third gay male cast member after Terry Sweeney (from the 1985-1986 cast) and John Milhiser (from the 2013-2014 cast), and the sixth homosexual cast member hired (joining Denny Dillon, Terry Sweeney, Danitra Vance, John Milhiser, and Kate McKinnon).
 Former cast member Eddie Murphy hosted on December 21, 2019, his first time hosting in 35 years, breaking the record for longest span of time between solo hosting appearances, set by Jeff Bridges in 2010 at 27 years.

References

2015
2010s in American television